Miah-Marie Langlois (born September 21, 1991) is a Canadian professional basketball player for WBC Dynamo Novosibirsk and the Canadian national team, with whom she participated at the 2014 FIBA World Championship.

College
Langlois attended the University of Windsor from 2010 to 2014, where she led the Windsor Lancers women's basketball team to four consecutive CIS national championships. She was a three-time CIS Final Eight Tournament MVP, and three-time CIS All-Canadian Defensive Player of the Year.

Pan Am games 2015
Langlois was a member of the Canada women's national basketball team which participated in basketball at the 2015 Pan American Games held in Toronto, Ontario, Canada July 10 to 26, 2015. Canada opened the preliminary rounds with an easy 101–38 win over Venezuela. The following day they beat Argentina 73–58. The final preliminary game was against Cuba; both teams were 2–0, so the winner would win the group. The game went down to the wire with Canada eking out a 71–68 win. Canada would face Brazil in the semifinal.

Everything seemed to go right in the semifinal game. Canada opened the game with an 11–2 run on seven consecutive points by Miranda Ayim. Langlois contributed five assists. In the third quarter Canada strongly out rebounded Brazil and hit 69% of their field goals to score 33 points in the quarter. Lizanne Murphy and Nirra Fields hit three-pointers to help extend the lead to 68–39 at the end of three quarters. Canada continued to dominate in the fourth quarter with three-pointers by Kia Nurse and Kim Gaucher. Canada went on to win the game 91–63 to earn a spot in the gold-medal game against the USA.

The gold-medal game matched up the host team Canada against USA, in a sold out arena dominated by fans in red and white and waving the Canadian flag. The Canadian team, arm in arm, sang Oh Canada as the respective national anthems were played.

After trading baskets early the US edged out to a double-digit lead in the second quarter. However the Canadians, spurred on by the home crowd cheering, fought back and tied up the game at halftime. In the third quarter, it was Canada's time to shine as they outscore the US 26–15. The lead would reach as high as 18 points. The USA would fight back, but not all the way and Canada won the game and the gold-medal 81–73. It was Canada's first gold-medal in basketball in the Pan Am games. Nurse was the star for Canada with 33 points, hitting 11 of her 12 free-throw attempts in 10 of her 17 field-goal attempts including two of three three-pointers. Langois had three rebounds and two steals.

FIBA Americas Women's Championship 2015
Langlois played for Canada at the 2015 FIBA Americas Women's Championship, a qualifying event used to determine invitations to the 2016 Olympics. The games were held in Edmonton, Alberta, Canada in August 2015. Canada was assigned to Group A and played Puerto Rico, Chile, the Dominican Republic and Cuba in the preliminary rounds. Canada won the first three games easily with a 94–57 win over Puerto Rico is the closest match. The final preliminary round game was against undefeated Cuba, a team Canada had faced in the Pan Am games. Cuba played well in that event and was expected to challenge Canada. However, Canada defeated Cuba 92–43 to win first place in the group for a spot in the semifinal against the second-place team in group B, Brazil. Langlois recorded seven assists, the highest on the team.

The semifinal game against Brazil was much closer. Canada led by only six points at halftime but gradually expanded the lead to end up with an 83–66 win, and a spot in the gold-medal game. The gold-medal game was a rematch with Cuba who won their semifinal game against Argentina. Despite the lopsided result in the preliminary rounds, Canada expected a closer game. Cuba started off strong and had an eight-point lead early in the game. Canada responded with a 16–0 run to take over the lead, but Cuba responded and took a small lead early in the second half. Then Canada took the lead back and gradually expanded the lead to end up with the win, 82–66. As the game wound down to the close, the crowd was chanting "Rio","Rio","Rio" in recognition of the fact that the win qualifies Canada for the Olympics in Rio in 2016. Langlois recorded eight assists, the highest on the team.

Awards and honors
U Sports women's basketball Top 100 Century Team (announced in March 2020)

References

External links

1991 births
Living people
Basketball players at the 2015 Pan American Games
Basketball players at the 2016 Summer Olympics
Black Canadian basketball players
Canadian expatriate basketball people in Russia
Canadian expatriate basketball people in Sweden
Canadian women's basketball players
Olympic basketball players of Canada
Pan American Games gold medalists for Canada
Pan American Games medalists in basketball
Point guards
Basketball players from Windsor, Ontario
University of Windsor alumni
Medalists at the 2015 Pan American Games